The Standing March is a collaborative art installation by the French artist JR and the American filmmaker Darren Aronofsky. The artwork, which depicts more than 500 people, was projected onto the facade of the National Assembly building during the 2015 United Nations Climate Change Conference in Paris.

See also
 2015 in art

References

2015 in Paris
2015 in the environment
2015 works
Collaborative projects
Politics of climate change